Orlando (foaled 1841) was a British Thoroughbred racehorse best known for winning the Derby and as a Leading sire in Great Britain and Ireland.

Racing record
Racing at age two, one of Orlando's most significant wins came in the July Stakes at Newmarket Racecourse. Ridden by Nat Flatman, the three-year-old Orlando finished second in the 1844 Epsom Derby but was awarded first place after an investigation concluded that winner "Running Rein" was in reality a four-year-old named Maccabeus who ran in Running Rein's name.

Stud record
Orlando stood at his owners stud until August 1851 when Peel held a dispersal sale and Orlando was sold to Charles Greville. Orlando was the Leading sire in Great Britain & Ireland three times, in 1851, 1854, and 1858. He was second and/or third on the sires list seven times between 1853 and 1861. In all, he was the sire of 352 horses who won a total of 797 races including four Classics. Teddington won the 1851 Epsom Derby, and Fazzoletto, Diophantus and Fitz-Roland, all won the 2,000 Guineas. His daughter, Imperieuse won the St Leger Stakes and One Thousand Guineas, and was the dam of Deliane (won FR Prix de Diane).

Orlando was also the grandsire of Ruthless, winner of the inaugural running of America's Belmont Stakes in 1867 and one of only three fillies to ever win that American Classic.

Pedigree

References

External links
Thoroughbred Heritage portraits

1841 racehorse births
Epsom Derby winners
Racehorses trained in the United Kingdom
Racehorses bred in the United Kingdom
Thoroughbred family 13-a